Bucknell University Press is a university press associated with Bucknell University, located in Lewisburg, Pennsylvania. The press was founded in 1968 and is currently a member of the Association of University Presses, to which it was admitted in 2016.

Bucknell University Press was previously a member of the now-defunct Associated University Presses consortium. From 2010 to 2017, the press's publications were distributed by Rowman & Littlefield. Presently, the press operates in partnership with Rutgers University Press: While Bucknell University Press maintains editorial control over their own imprint, Rutgers pays for the cost of production.

Publications

Notable book series 
Notable book series published by Bucknell University Press include the following:
 "Aperçus: Histories Texts Cultures", edited by Kat Lecky
 "Bucknell Studies in Latin American Literature and Theory", edited by Aníbal González
 "Contemporary Irish Writers", edited by Anne Fogarty
 "Griot Project Book Series", co-published by the Institute for the Study of Black Lives and Cultures
 "New Studies in the Age of Goethe", edited by John B. Lyon
 "Scènes francophones: Studies in French and Francophone Theater", edited by Logan Connors
 "Stories of the Susquehanna Valley", edited by Alfred Siewers
 "Studies in Eighteenth Century Scotland", edited by Pam Perkins
 "Transits: Literature, Thought & Culture 1650-1850", edited by Miriam L. Wallace

Journals 
Notable academic journals published by Bucknell University Press include the following:
 1650-1850: Ideas, Aesthetics, and Inquiries in the Early Modern Era
 The Age of Johnson: A Scholarly Annual
 The Bucknell Review

See also

 List of English-language book publishing companies
 List of university presses

References

External links
Bucknell University Press

Bucknell University Press at Rutgers UP

Bucknell University Press
Bucknell University Press